Gail Renshaw (born c. 1947) is a former American beauty queen.

An early marriage of her was divorced.  

She was Miss World USA 1969. Renshaw was 1st runner-up at the 1969 Miss World competition. After the pageant, she resigned her title in order to get married, and was replaced by the runner-up in the USA contest, Connie Haggard from Texas. Gail graduated from Washington-Lee High School in Arlington, Virginia in 1965.

She was briefly engaged to Dean Martin. Later her name was Gail Renshaw Blackwell. She studied and became registered nurse, specializing in dialysis.

References

Living people
1940s births
Miss World 1969 delegates
American beauty pageant winners
Washington-Liberty High School alumni